His Robe of Honor is a 1918 American silent crime drama film directed by Rex Ingram and starring Henry B. Walthall, Mary Charleson and Lois Wilson.

The film's sets were designed by the art director R. Holmes Paul.

Cast
 Henry B. Walthall as Julian Randolph 
 Mary Charleson as Roxana Frisbee 
 Lois Wilson as Laura Nelson 
 Noah Beery as 'Boss' Nordhoff 
 Joseph J. Dowling as Bruce Nelson 
 Roy Laidlaw as Robert Partland 
 Fred Montague as Million Mulligan 
 Eugene Pallette as Clifford Nordhoff 
 Guy Newhard as Carrots

References

Bibliography
 Leonhard Gmür. Rex Ingram: Hollywood's Rebel of the Silver Screen. 2013.

External links
 

1918 films
1918 crime drama films
American silent feature films
American crime drama films
Films directed by Rex Ingram
American black-and-white films
Films distributed by W. W. Hodkinson Corporation
1910s English-language films
1910s American films
Silent American drama films